Paul Blake (19 October 1965 – 18 May 2017), better known as Frankie Paul, was a Jamaican dancehall reggae artist. Born blind, he has been dubbed by some 'The Jamaican Stevie Wonder'.

Biography
Born in Jamaica in 1965, Blake was born blind but as a child had his sight partially restored by an operation on a hospital ship. He sang for, and impressed Stevie Wonder when Wonder visited the school that Blake attended, prompting him to pursue a singing career. 

Adopting the stage name Frankie Paul, he first found fame in the early 1980s, and he recorded prolifically throughout the decade. He recorded for virtually every producer/studio in Jamaica at some time, and was known to release several albums a year.

Notable works of Frankie Paul include the popular "Sara" and "Worries in the Dance". 

Paul resided in The Gambia from 1994. In January 2016 he underwent surgery to amputate a foot and part of his leg.

Frankie Paul died on 18 May 2017 from complications with his liver at the University Hospital of the West Indies in Kingston, Jamaica.

Discography

Albums
Give the Youth a Chance (1982), Freedom Sounds – also released as Rich & Poor
Pass the Tu-Sheng-Peng (1985), Nyam Up
Tidal Wave (1985), Greensleeves
Over the Wall (1985), Crystal
Still Alive (1985), Jammy's
Shut Up Bway (1986), Ujama
Sara (1987), Jammy's (JA) / Live & Love (UK/US)
Warning (1987), RAS
Alesha (1987)
Fire Deh a Mus Tail (1988), Blacka Dread
Dance Hall Duo (1988), RAS
Slow Down (1988), VP
Frankie Paul at Studio One (1988), Studio One
Veteran (1989), VP
Reaching Out (1989), Blue Mountain
Can't Get You Out of My Mind (1990), Rohit
Detrimental (1990), Rohit
Get Closer (1990), Profile
Start of Romance (1991), Sonic Sounds
Best in Me (1991), VP
Let's Chill (1991), VP
Jamming (1991), VP
Should I (1991), Heartbeat
Money Talk (1991), Jammy's
Sleepless Night (1992), Sonic Sounds
Hot Number (1992), VP
Tomorrow (1992), Sonic Sounds
Cassanova (1992), Dynamic Sounds
Live & Love (1992), VP
Sizzling (1992), VP
Don Man (1993), Philo
Talk All You Want (1994), VP
Hard Work (1994), RAS
Time Less (1995), Tan-yah
If You Want Me Girl (1995), Trojan
Come Back Again (1996),	VP
Freedom (1996), RAS
A We Rule (1997), RAS
Live at Maritime Hall (1999), Artists Only
Give Me That Feeling Freedom Blues (1999), Foxtail
Forever (1999), World
Rock On (1999), Charm
Every Nigger Is a Star! (2000), Greensleeves
Remember the Time (2001), Artists Only
I Be Hold (2001), T.P.
Don't Wanna Get Funky (2001), Prestige Elite
Sara (2002), Fatman
Blessed Me (2002), Scorpio
Hardcore Loving (2003), Charm
Asking for Love (2004), Jet Star
Who Issued the Guns (2006), Music Avenue
Are You Ready (2007), Cousins
Best of Friends (2007), Charm
Tink Say Dem Know Me (2008), Jet Star
Most Wanted (2011), Greensleeves

References

External links
 

1965 births
2017 deaths
Musicians from Kingston, Jamaica
Jamaican male singers
Jamaican reggae singers
Blind musicians
VP Records artists
Heartbeat Records artists